The Butterfield Overland Mail Route Segment is a stretch of historic roadway in Washington and Crawford counties in northwestern Arkansas. It was historically used by the Butterfield Overland Mail service between 1858 and 1861.

The roadway segment was listed on the National Register of Historic Places in 2010.

See also
National Register of Historic Places listings in Washington County, Arkansas
National Register of Historic Places listings in Crawford County, Arkansas

References

Roads on the National Register of Historic Places in Arkansas
Transportation in Washington County, Arkansas
Transportation in Crawford County, Arkansas
National Register of Historic Places in Crawford County, Arkansas
Butterfield Overland Mail in Arkansas